Michael Matthew Dean (born 7 June 1972) is an English cricketer.  Dean is a right-handed batsman who bowls right-arm medium pace.  He was born at Sutton Coldfield, Warwickshire.

Dean represented the Warwickshire Cricket Board in a single List A match against Herefordshire in the 1st round of the 2003 Cheltenham & Gloucester Trophy which was held in 2002.  In his only List A match, he scored an unbeaten 8 runs.

References

External links
Michael Dean at Cricinfo
Michael Dean at CricketArchive

1972 births
Living people
Cricketers from Sutton Coldfield
People from Warwickshire
English cricketers
Warwickshire Cricket Board cricketers